Tripotamo (Greek: Τριπόταμο) may refer to several villages in Greece:

Tripotamo, Arcadia, a village in Arcadia
Tripotamo, Evrytania, a village in Evrytania

See also
Tripotamos (disambiguation)